Shafique Khan (born 30 June 1968) is an Indian musician  who plays the sitar. He belongs to the sixth generation of musicians in the family of illustrious sitar players whose contributing in popularizing sitar down the Vindhyaas is unparalleled.   from the Dharwad Gharana. His father, the late Ustad Abdul Karim Khan was a distinguished sitarist at his time. His grandfather  Rahimat Khan who was awarded the 'Sitar Ratna' Rahimat Khan a legendary  sitar artist was a disciple of Ustad bande ali khan. Shafique Khan had a fortune of long and traditional grooming from young age from his father Ustad Abdul Karim Khan who was head of faculty of instrumental music in Karnatak University college of music.

Early life and education 
Shafique Khan is the younger brother of Ustad Bale Khan  and Chhote Rahimat Khan and has a twin brother, Rafique Khan, also a known sitarist and composer,

Musical Style 
Naturally Shafique Khans's style  reflects the finer aspects of sitar playing of all his mentors. His style that blend of both Gaayaki Ang (Vocal style) and Tantakari Ang (Instrumental style).

Achievements 
Shafique Khan been conferred with Surmani award by Swami Haridas Sangeet Sammelan Mumbai. Kala Vikas Parishat has honoured him by conferring Bharat Ratna Pandit Bhimsen Joshi National Award in 2016. His Musical sojourn has taken him to Germany and United States.
Sitar Jugalbandi performances with his twin brother  Rafique Khan have won encomium from music lovers.

Current position 
Shafique Khan currently works at All India Radio as top Grade Artist, Dharwad  Karnataka

References

External links 
 Sitar Nawaz Ustad Bale Khan

Living people
1968 births
Indian male classical musicians
Sitar players
People from Dharwad
Musicians from Karnataka